Cattle Queen is a 1951 American Western film directed by Robert Emmett Tansey and starring Maria Hart, Drake Smith and William Fawcett.

It was shot at the Iverson Ranch. Sets were designed by the art director Vin Taylor. It was one of the final films released by the independent distributor Eagle-Lion.

Plot
A female ranch owner employs three ex-convicts in an attempt to clean up a lawless town.

Cast
 Maria Hart as Queenie Hart 
 Drake Smith as Bill Foster 
 William Fawcett as Alkali 
 Robert Gardett as Duke Drake 
 Johnny Carpenter as The Tucson Kid 
 Edward Clark as Doc Hodges 
 Emile Meyer as Shotgun Thompson 
 James Pierce as Bad Bill Smith 
 Joe Bailey as Blackie Malone 
 Douglas Wood as Judge Whipple - Bartender 
 Alyn Lockwood as Rosa - Saloon Girl 
 I. Stanford Jolley as Scarface - Outlaw Leader 
 Lane Chandler as Marshal Houston 
 William Bailey as Warden 
 Frank Marlowe as Stage Driver 
 Roger Anderson as Lefty - Henchman 
 Vern Teters as Trig - Henchman 
 Steve Conte as Mac - Henchman 
 Robert Robinson as Armstrong - Cattle Buyer

References

Bibliography
 Pitts, Michael R. Western Movies: A Guide to 5,105 Feature Films. McFarland, 2012.

External links
 

1951 films
1951 Western (genre) films
1950s English-language films
American Western (genre) films
Films directed by Robert Emmett Tansey
Eagle-Lion Films films
American black-and-white films
1950s American films